Punta Fortino Lighthouse is an active lighthouse at the northern point of Agropoli, Campania on the Tyrrhenian Sea.

Description
The lighthouse is completely automated and operated by the Marina Militare with the identification code number 2660 E.F.

See also
 List of lighthouses in Italy
 Agropoli

References

External links
 Servizio Fari Marina Militare

Lighthouses in Italy